Turritella sanguinea is a species of sea snail, a marine gastropod mollusk in the family Turritellidae.

Description
The length of the shell varies between 30 mm and 45 mm.

Distribution
This marine species occurs off Port Alfred to Southern KwaZulu-Natal. South Africa

References

 Sowerby, G.B. Jr. (1870). Descriptions of Forty-eight new Species of Shells. Proc. Zool. Soc. Lond. (1870): 249-259
 Tomlin, J. R. le B. (1925) Reports on the Marine Mollusca in the Collections of the South African Museum. Annals of the South African Museum. Vol. 20(4) (7), pp. 309–316.
 Kilburn, R.N. & Rippey, E. (1982) Sea Shells of Southern Africa. Macmillan South Africa, Johannesburg, xi + 249 pp
 Vine, P. (1986). Red Sea Invertebrates. Immel Publishing, London. 224 pp. 
 Martens, E. von & Thiele, J. (1904) Die beschalten Gastropoden der Deutschen Tiefsee-Expedition 1898–1899. in Chun, C. (Ed.) Wissenschaftliche Ergebnisse der Deutschen Tiefsee-Expedition auf dem dampfer "Valdivia" 1898–1899. Vol. 7. pp. 1–180, Pls 1-29 & 1 text figure.
 Kobelt, W. (1897) Systematisches Conchylien-Cabinet von Martini und Chemnitz. Bd. 1, Abt. 27. Die Gattung Turritella. Nürnberg, Baner & Raspe. pp. 1–81, pls 1-21
 Sowerby, G.B., III. (1892) Marine Shells of South Africa. G.B. Sowerby, London, iv + 89 pp., 5 pls.
 Steyn, D.G. & Lussi, M. (1998) Marine Shells of South Africa. An Illustrated Collector's Guide to Beached Shells. Ekogilde Publishers, Hartebeespoort, South Africa, ii + 264 pp.

External links
 Reeve, L.A. (1849). Monograph of the genus Turritella. In: Conchologia Iconica. vol. 5, pl. 1-11 and unpaginated text. L. Reeve & Co., London.
 Tryon G.W., jr. (1886). Manual of conchology, structural and systematic, with illustrations of the species. (1)8: Naticidae, Calyptraeidae, Turritellidae, Vermetidae, Caecidae, Eulimidae, Turbonillidae, Pyramidellidae. pp. 1-461, pls. 1-79, Philadelphia, published by the author
 Petit, R. E. (2009). George Brettingham Sowerby, I, II & III: their conchological publications and molluscan taxa. Zootaxa. 2189: 1–218
  Two Oceans. 5th impression. David Philip, Cate Town & Johannesburg

Turritellidae
Gastropods described in 1849